The Battle of Yurkud was a three-hour-long military engagement on 10 March 2012 fought between Ethiopian military forces and al-Shabab militants approximately 40 km from the Ethiopian border. According to Ethiopian sources, al-Shabab initiated the engagement with an attack on a military base in Yurkud at around 6 a.m. Fighting continued for three hours before, as locals report, al-Shabab was forced to retreat. The number of dead on either side is not known, with reports varying widely. Al-Shabab claimed to have lost five and killed 73, while one local resident said he saw at least 17 al-Shabab dead and another claimed he had seen six dead Ethiopian soldiers.

References

Yurkud 2012
2012 in Somalia
Yurkud 2012
Yurkud 2012
March 2012 events in Africa
Ethiopia–Somalia military relations
Yurkud